Oakland Plantation may refer to:

in the United States;
(by state)
 Oakland Plantation (Bossier Parish, Louisiana)
 Oakland Plantation House (Gurley, Louisiana), listed on the National Register of Historic Places (NRHP) in East Feliciana Parish, Louisiana
 Oakland Plantation (Natchitoches, Louisiana), a U.S. National Historic Landmark in Natchitoches Parish, Louisiana
 Oakland Plantation (Carvers, North Carolina), listed on the NRHP in Bladen County, North Carolina
 Oakland Plantation (Tarboro, North Carolina), listed on the NRHP in Edgecombe County, North Carolina
 Oakland Plantation (Beech Island, South Carolina), listed on the NRHP in Aiken County, South Carolina
 Oakland Plantation (Fort Motte, South Carolina), listed on the NRHP in Calhoun County, South Carolina
 Oakland Plantation House (Mount Pleasant, South Carolina), listed on the NRHP in Charleston County, South Carolina

See also
Oakland (disambiguation), which includes several NRHP places named Oakland which may be plantations